This is a list of rappers and hip hop musicians murdered since 1987.

Two studies in the mid-2010s concluded that murder was the cause of half of hip hop musician deaths. The average age of death is between 25–30 years of age. Hip hop artists have a higher rate of homicide than artists of any other genre of music, ranging from five to 32 times higher. 

Some reasons cited for the high homicide rate include poor background of many artists, criminal gang activity, drug use, and inadequate pastoral care among artists and record labels. In 2020, XXL wrote that of 77 rapper deaths they examined, more than 40 remain unsolved, including the 1996 murder of Tupac Shakur, the 1997 murder of the Notorious B.I.G., and the 1999 murder of Big L.

List

References 

Hip hop musicians
Murdered
Hip hop musicians
Criticism of hip-hop
Music controversies